The North Dakota Game and Fish Department is the State of North Dakota's State agency charged with stewardship of the state's fish, game, and wildlife resources. The department sets fish and game regulations, including issuance of hunting and fishing licenses and enforcement of state regulations throughout the state. The department also enforces watercraft regulations and registration, along with enforcement of Invasive species laws.

Organization
The agency is headquartered in Bismarck, with District Offices located in: Devils Lake, Dickinson, Jamestown, Harvey, Riverdale, and Williston. The agency is organized into five divisions:

 Administrative Services - Manages Information Technology, accounting, and issues boat registrations along with hunting and fishing licenses. 
 Conservation/Communication - Manages outdoor education, interpretation, and encourages conservation practices throughout the state.
 Enforcement - The law enforcement division consists of Game Wardens that patrol the state to enforce fish and game regulations and other state laws. 
 Fisheries - Manage the state fisheries and operate the state's fish hatcheries. 
 Wildlife - Manage habitat and wildlife species across the state.

See also

 North Dakota Parks and Recreation Department
 List of law enforcement agencies in North Dakota
 Game warden
 List of State Fish and Wildlife Management Agencies in the U.S.

References

External links
 North Dakota Game and Fish Department (Official site)
 "75 Years of the Game and Fish as we Know it Today", by Ron Wilson

State law enforcement agencies of North Dakota
Environment of North Dakota
State agencies of North Dakota
Natural resources agencies in the United States